Eucalyptus pterocarpa is a species of mallet or tree that is endemic to a small area in the southwest of Western Australia. It has smooth bark, lance-shaped adult leaves, flower buds in groups of seven, white flowers and conical or cup-shaped fruit.

Description
Eucalyptus pterocarpa is a mallet or a tree that typically grows to a height of  but does not form a lignotuber. It has smooth, light grey over salmon grey bark that is shed in long ribbons. Flowering has been observed in October and the flowers are white.

Taxonomy

Distribution and habitat
This eucalypt grows in flat areas in forest and on the margins of creeks and streams between Kalgoorlie and Norseman where it grows in red-brown sandy-loam soils.

Conservation status
This species is classified as "Priority Three" by the Government of Western Australia Department of Parks and Wildlife meaning that it is poorly known and known from only a few locations but is not under imminent threat.

See also
List of Eucalyptus species

References

Eucalypts of Western Australia
Trees of Australia
pterocarpa
Myrtales of Australia
Plants described in 1988